Sergey Petrovich Kovalchuk (born 16 December 1973) is a Belarusian professional football coach and a former player. Since 2005, he has worked for Dinamo Brest in various coaching positions.

References

External links
 Profile at Dinamo Brest website

1973 births
Living people
Belarusian footballers
Belarusian football managers
FC Dynamo Brest players
FC Kobrin players
FC Dynamo Brest managers
Association football midfielders
Sportspeople from Brest, Belarus